Distant Shores or Distant Shore may refer to:

 Distant Shores (UK TV series), a British dramedic television series
 Distant Shores (album), a 1966 album by Chad & Jeremy
 Distant Shore (song), a song by Dirty Three
 Distant Shore, a 2003 album by Karan Casey
 Distant Shore (album), a 2009 album by Órla Fallon

See also 
 A Distant Shore (disambiguation)